Gauss was an Italian professional cycling team, which competed in elite road bicycle racing events such as the UCI Women's Road World Cup. For the 2012 season the team merged with MCipollini–Giambenini.

Major wins
2008
Stage 2 La Route de France Féminine, Martina Corazza
Stage 2 Tour Féminin en Limousin, Yuliya Martisova
Stage 4 Internationale Thüringen Rundfahrt der Frauen, Grete Treier
Stage 4b Tour de Bretagne Féminin, Tatiana Sharakova
Stage 6 Vuelta Ciclista Femenina a El Salvador, Claudia Leal Balderas

2009
Stage 1 Giro d'Italia Femminile, Edita Pučinskaitė

2010 
Stages 2 & 6 Giro della Toscana Int. Femminile, Giorgia Bronzini
Stage 2 Holland Ladies Tour, Martine Bras
Stage 2 Internationale Thüringen Rundfahrt der Frauen, Edita Pučinskaitė
GP Cento – Carnevale d'Europa, Giorgia Bronzini
Stage 2 Ladies Tour of Qatar, Giorgia Bronzini

National and continental champions
2008
 Russia Road Race, Yuliya Martisova
 Belarus Road Race, Tatiana Sharakova
 Estonia Road Race, Grete Treier
 Estonia Time Trial, Grete Treier
 Belarus Time Trial, Tatiana Sharakova
 Italy Time Trial, Tatiana Guderzo

2009
 Russia Time Trial, Tatiana Antoshina

2010
 World Road Race, Giorgia Bronzini

References

Cycling teams based in Italy
UCI Women's Teams
Cycling teams established in 2008
2008 establishments in Italy
Cycling teams disestablished in 2011
2011 disestablishments in Italy